Obsession is a 1991 song recorded by Swedish band Army of Lovers. It is one of their most well-known songs and scored chart success across Europe. Released as the second single from their second album, Massive Luxury Overdose (1991), it soared to the number-one position on both the radio and the dance charts in Sweden. It also peaked at number two on the Swedish singles chart, number four in Belgium, number seven in Austria and Germany, and number nine in Spain. The lyrics are written by Alexander Bard and Anders Wollbeck, and the song is in part inspired by Laurie Anderson's 1981 song, "O Superman". Primarily, the "ah ah" looped backing track.

In 1992, they re-released the single exclusively for the US and includes remixes only found in this version. It got released in September, exactly a year apart from the original release, and went to number eleven on the Billboard Dance Club Songs chart.

Critical reception
Andy Kastanas from The Charlotte Observer deemed it "another good song that deserves a listen". He added, "This is much more downbeat than their earlier stuff, with easier vocals and a sound reminiscent of old Imagination or Enigma." Pan-European magazine Music & Media called it "slow disco". A reviewer from Newcastle Evening Chronicle wrote that it's "mesmerising".

Chart performance
"Obsession" was successful on the charts in Europe. It reached number two in the band's native Sweden, being held off reaching the top spot by Bryan Adams' "(Everything I Do) I Do It For You". The song stayed within the top 10 for six weeks. Additionally, it hit number-one on both the Swedish radio chart and the Swedish dance chart. It made it to the top 10 also in Austria, Belgium, Finland, Germany, Greece, the Netherlands, Spain and Sweden. In the United Kingdom, "Obsession" peaked at number 67 in its first week at the UK Singles Chart, on December 22, 1991. On the Eurochart Hot 100, it hit number 29 in February 1992. That year, it charted also in the United States, peaking at number eleven on the Billboard Dance Club Songs chart.

Music video
The band released two versions of the music video. It features the band performing in what appears to be a mental institution. The first version, from 1991, features La Camilla. But after she left the group, she was replaced by De La Cour who appear in the second version from 1992. 

Both videos were directed by Swedish director Fredrik Boklund. He also directed the other videos for Army of Lovers. The first version of "Obsession" was later published on YouTube in May 2016. By September 2020, the video had amassed more than 4,1 million views.

Single track listing

Charts

References

 

1991 singles
Army of Lovers songs
English-language Swedish songs
Songs written by Alexander Bard
1991 songs
Songs written by Anders Wollbeck
Music videos directed by Fredrik Boklund